Ericek can refer to the following villages in Turkey:

 Ericek, Bolu
 Ericek, Buharkent
 Ericek, Çameli
 Ericek, Dursunbey
 Ericek, Ilgaz
 Ericek, Nallıhan
 Ericek, Osmaneli